"Take Me or Leave Me" is a song from the musical Rent, written by American composer Jonathan Larson. In the original 1996 Broadway production, the song was performed by Idina Menzel as Maureen and Fredi Walker as Joanne.

Film version

In the 2005 film adaptation, "Take Me or Leave Me" is performed by Menzel, reprising her role as Maureen, and Tracie Thoms as Joanne, since Walker-Browne was considered too old for the role. Remixes of the song were released on April 11, 2006.

Track listings

Charts

Performances and covers
Menzel has performed the song on a few concerts and tours, including the Barefoot at the Symphony Tour, Idina Menzel: Live at Radio City, Idina Menzel: World Tour, as a duet with randomly-chosen audience members. She also performed the song at the end of a curtain call for If/Then in 2014.

The song has been covered numerous times, with The Atlantic calling it a "modern musical theatre staple". Darren Criss and Aaron Tveit covered the song on a Skype conversation to promote Elsie Fest. In 2016, Anika Larsen and Keala Settle performed the song for From Broadway with Love: A Benefit Concert for Orlando, in support of the victims of the Orlando nightclub shooting. It was covered on the TV series Glee, by the characters Rachel Berry (Lea Michele) and Mercedes Jones (Amber Riley) in the episode "Comeback". Kevin Fallon of The Atlantic praised the cover as the highlight of the episode.

Charts (Glee version)

References

1996 songs
2006 singles
Idina Menzel songs
LGBT-related songs
Song recordings produced by Arif Mardin
Song recordings produced by Rob Cavallo
Songs from Rent (musical)
Male–female vocal duets
Warner Records singles
Songs written by Jonathan Larson